Hougang Mall (Chinese: 后港购物坊), previously known as NTUC Hougang Mall, is a suburban shopping mall in Hougang, Singapore. It is near Hougang Central Bus Interchange, as well as Hougang MRT station.

In 2006, the mall underwent renovation; it transformed part of the second level, formerly occupied by NTUC FairPrice, into a food cluster. The mall previously had renovations done on the fifth level.

Before renovations, a food court stood on the fifth floor. Now, a playground (on the roof which offers a good view of the surrounding HDB flats), and some other shops are on the fifth floor while the food court was shifted to level 4 to the area which previously housed the NTUC Club.

In October 2020, Frasers Property acquired Hougang Mall, which was previously under AsiaMalls Management Limited, under its property.

References

External links
 

Shopping malls in Singapore
Buildings and structures in Hougang